Baker County School District is a public school district that covers Baker County, Florida.

School Board Officials

The district's school board is elected on a non-partisan basis.  The superintendent of schools is a non-partisan elected position.

Superintendent of schools:  Sherrie Raulerson (R)
District 1:  Tiffany Harvey McInarnay (R)
District 2:  Richard Dean Griffis (R)
District 3:  Paula Barton (D)
District 4:  Charlie M. Burnett, III (R)
District 5:  Amanda Rhoden Hodges (R)

Schools

The district operates the following public schools:

High school

Baker County High School (Wildcat)
Principal Johnnie Jacobs

Middle schools

Baker County Middle School
Principal Thomas Hill

Intermediate school

Keller Intermediate School
Principal Kelly Horne

Elementary schools

Macclenny Elementary School
Principal Lynn Green
Westside Elementary School
Principal Debbie Fraser

Pre-K/Kindergarten Center
Principal: Bonnie Jones

References

External links
 

School districts in Florida
Education in Baker County, Florida